John Catlin may refer to:

 John Catlin (golfer) (born 1990), American golfer
 John Catlin (politician) (1803–1874), American politician
 John C. Catlin (1871–1951), American lawyer and politician